(16 November 1950 – 27 January 2001) was a sumo wrestler from Motosu, Gifu, Japan. He made his professional debut in September 1968. He holds the record jointly with Oshio for the most tournaments fought in the juryo division, at 55. He spent four tournaments in the top makuuchi division, peaking at maegashira 6 in November 1984. At around  he was one of the lightest sekitori. He retired in 1987 and became an elder of the Japan Sumo Association under the name Onogawa until his death in 2001.

Career
He was born in Motosu, Gifu and joined Kasugano stable in September 1968, recruited by ex-yokozuna Tochinishiki. He used his own surname of Hachiya rather than a traditional shikona for nearly all of his career, as it already had an unusual ring to it (literally meaning "bee's arrow"). As he rose up the ranks he served as a tsukebito or personal attendant to Kitanoumi of the affiliated Mihogaseki stable, and the two eventually became close friends. He became a sekitori upon promotion to the juryo division in May 1976. He did not reach the top makuuchi division until November 1981, his 80th career tournament. He was ranked in the top division for only four tournaments, compiling a win-loss record of 26-34. His highest rank was maegashira 6, which he reached in November 1984. He retired in September 1987 at the age of 36 after being demoted to the unsalaried makushita division. He had never missed a bout in his entire career, fighting 1263 consecutive matches.

Retirement from sumo
Hachiya was able to stay in sumo as an elder of the Japan Sumo Association because of his old friend Kitanoumi, who lent him his elder name of Onogawa (which he did not need himself as he had been made an ichidai or one-generation elder and was allowed to keep his fighting name after retirement). Hachiya worked as a coach at Kitanoumi stable until his death in January 2001 at the age of 50 from cancer of the upper jaw.

Fighting style
At  and  Hachiya was small for a sumo wrestler but he used power and skill to counteract his light weight, regularly carrying his opponents out of the dohyo by tsuri-dashi (lift out). He was particularly fond of ashi-waza, or techniques aimed at the opponent's legs, such as uchi-muso or "inner thigh propping twist down."

Career record

See also
Glossary of sumo terms
List of past sumo wrestlers
List of sumo tournament second division champions

References

1950 births
2001 deaths
Japanese sumo wrestlers
Sumo people from Gifu Prefecture
Sumo wrestlers who use their birth name